The following radio stations broadcast on FM frequency 102.6 MHz:

Belgium
 Musiq'3 in Hainaut

Bosnia
 Radio Prača in Goražde

China 
 CNR The Voice of China in Xiamen and Zhangzhou

Fiji
 Bula FM in Suva, Nadi, Lautoka and Labasa

France
 Vibration in Châteauroux

Ireland
 Beat 102 103 in Gorey
 C103 in Cork City and East Cork
 Highland Radio in West Donegal
 Midlands 103 in Stradbally and Boris-in-Ossory

India
 AIR FM Rainbow in Delhi and Srinagar

Indonesia
 Radio Maritim Rassonia in Cirebon
 Radio Camajaya in Jakarta

Nepal
 Radio Devghat in Devghat
 Samad FM in Lahan

Netherlands
 Radio 538 in Overijssel and Gelderland

Romania
 Radio Chișinău in Briceni

Taiwan 
 Transfers CNR The Voice of China in Kinmen

United Kingdom
 Heart Essex in Chelmsford, Braintree, Witham, Maldon and South Woodham Ferrers
 Heart West in Somerset
 Heart South in Oxfordshire
 Metro Radio in Alnwick
 Signal 1 in North Staffordshire and South Cheshire
 Sine FM in Doncaster, South Yorkshire

References

Lists of radio stations by frequency